Linda Elriani (née Charman; born 21 November 1971 in Eastbourne, United Kingdom) is a squash coach and former professional squash player from England.

As a player, Elriani turned professional in 1990. She appeared in 32 professional tour finals, winning 15 titles. She also won the British National Championship title in 2005. Elriani reached a career-high world ranking of World No. 3 in 2000. She was the captain of the England team which won the World Team Squash Championships in 2000. At the 2002 Commonwealth Games, she won a Bronze Medal in the women's doubles, partnering Fiona Geaves.

Elriani retired from the professional tour in 2006.

She is married to the French squash player Laurent Elriani. Laurent Elriani was honored as the United States Olympic Committee National Coach of the Year in 2017, for coaching an incredible quartet of young squash players, which included the reigning U19 and U17 boy's champions and the number 1 ranked U19 and U17 boys. Laurent has been a lead coach on the US Squash annual trip to the British Junior Open. https://ussquash.org/2017/10/laurent-elriani-presented-usoc-coach-of-the-year-award/

World Team Championships

Finals: 5 (1 title, 4 runner-up)

See also
 Official Women's Squash World Ranking

External links 
 
 
 
 
 
 Article at Squashplayer.co.uk (2006)
 SquashSite article on Linda's retirement (2006)
 
 

1971 births
Living people
Sportspeople from Eastbourne
English female squash players
Commonwealth Games bronze medallists for England
Commonwealth Games medallists in squash
Squash players at the 2002 Commonwealth Games
World Games bronze medalists
Competitors at the 2005 World Games
Medallists at the 2002 Commonwealth Games